Big W (or BIG W) may refer to one of two unrelated retail operations:

 Big W, an Australian chain of discount stores owned by Woolworths Limited (an Australian company)
 Big W, a now-defunct British chain of large-format stores owned by Woolworths Group (a British company)

It may also refer to:
 the "big W", a significant location in the film It's a Mad, Mad, Mad, Mad World
 The logo used for Warner Communications